(R)-3-Nitrobiphenyline is a drug which acts as an α-adrenergic agonist, selective for the α subtype, as well as being a weak antagonist at the α and α subtypes. It has been used in scientific research to characterize the binding and functional properties of the α subtype.

References

Alpha-2 adrenergic receptor agonists
Biphenyls
Imidazolines
Nitrobenzenes
Phenol ethers